Blue Mountain Heights is a residential locality in the Toowoomba Region, Queensland, Australia.

Geography 

History 
The locality was originally called Blue Mountain Estate, after the name of a local hotel.

Residents had a median individual income of $585, compared with $448 for the Toowoomba statistical district, and a median family income of $1,559 compared to $1,116. The suburb had a SEIFA score of 1140, placing it ahead of all other suburbs except Redwood.

References

Suburbs of Toowoomba
1975 establishments in Australia
Populated places established in 1975
Localities in Queensland